Bekky Livesey (born 19 September 1995) is a British judoka.

Judo career
She is the bronze medallist of the 2017 Judo Grand Prix Antalya in the -57 kg category. She became champion of Great Britain, winning the half-middleweight division at the British Judo Championships in 2019.

Personal history
Bekky Livesey has a sister named Amy Livesey, who has won British championships at half-middleweight and a brother Owen Livesey, who is a three-times British champion at half-middleweight.

References

External links
 

1995 births
Living people
British female judoka